Football at the 2015 Island Games took place from 28 June – 3 July 2015 in Jersey.  Matches were played at Springfield Stadium.

Events

Medal table

Medal summary

References

 
2015 in association football
football
Football in Jersey
2015